The Maldives national football team (Dhivehi: ދިވެހިރާއްޖޭ ގައުމީ ފުޓްބޯލް ޓީމް) represents the Maldives in international football and is controlled by the Football Association of Maldives. It is a member of the Asian Football Confederation (AFC).

The Maldives' most significant success was winning the 2008 SAFF Championship where they beat the most successful team India in the final 1–0. They won their second local title in 2018 SAFF Championship, once again by beating India in the final.

History

South Asian Football Championship

1997 South Asian Football Federation Gold Cup

This was the third edition of SAFF Cup which was held in Kathmandu, Nepal, and it was Maldives' first campaign in this regional tournament.

Maldives was placed in the group B with India and Bangladesh, where they advanced into the semi final as the group's second team with two points in hand. They drew their first match against Bangladesh with the help of Lirugham Saeed's only goal. In the second match, they drew against the India 2–2, in which Ibrahim Rasheed and Mohamed Nizam came scoring when the Red Snappers were at a two-goal deposit.

Maldives went on to win the semi final match 2–1 against Sri Lanka with Shah Ismail and Mohamed Nizam on the scoreline, but lost the final match to India by 5–1, where Adam Abdul Latheef scored the only goal for Maldives.

1999 South Asian Football Federation Gold Cup

In this edition of SAFF Cup, hosted in Fatorda Stadium, Goa, India, Maldives were grouped with Nepal and Sri Lanka, where Maldives finished at the top of the group B.

First match against Sri Lanka ended as a goalless draw while they managed to win 3–2 against the Nepal. Shah Ismail, Mohamed Wildhan and Mausoom Abdul Gafoor scored the goals for Maldives in this match.

Maldives had to face the two times SAFF Cup champion India in the semi final and lost the game by 2–1, where Mohamed Wildhan scored against the Blue Tigers. Though they failed to qualify for the Final of the tournament, they claimed the bronze by defeating Nepal in the third place play-off match by 2–0. Mohamed Wildhan and Mohamed Ibrahim were the goal scorers.

Mohamed Wildhan shared the top scorer award with Nepal's Naresh Joshi, India's Baichung Bhutia and Bangladesh's Mihazur Rehman scoring three goals each in this competition.

2003 South Asian Football Federation Gold Cup

In the 2003 SAFF Gold Cup held in Dhaka, Bangladesh, Maldives were drawn in the group B along with Bangladesh, Nepal and Bhutan.

Maldives won their first match 6–0 a record win of the highest number of goals scored by a team in a single match in this tournament history against Bhutan, with Maldives' first hat-trick in the regional tournament, scored by Ali Shiham. Mohamed Nizam, Ashraf Luthfy and Ali Umar scored one goal each in this victory. Despite the 1–0 loss to Bangladesh in the second match, Maldives won their third match against Nepal and they were through into the semi final of the tournament as the group runners-up. Mohamed Nizam, Ashraf Luthfy and Ali Umar scored in their 3–2 win over Nepal.

Ibrahim Fazeel scored the only goal against Pakistan in the semi final, which helped them to reach the final for the second time. Ali Umar's only goal in the second half helped Maldives to survive until the penalty shootout in the final match against Bangladesh, but Maldives lost 5–3 at the Bangabandhu National Stadium where Ahmed Naaz, Ismail Naseem and Ibrahim Fazeel succeeded to convert it from the spot but Ashraf Luthfy failed.

2005 South Asian Football Federation Gold Cup

In 2005, the tournament was held in Pakistan and Maldives were drawn with Afghanistan and Sri Lanka along with the host Pakistan in group A.

Maldives started their campaign by breaking their own record created in the previous edition 2003, scoring a highest number of goals by a team in a single match. They won the first match 9–1 against Afghanistan. Ibrahim Fazeel and Ahmed Thoriq both scored a hat-trick while Ali Ashfaq scored a brace and Ali Umar scored their opener. They won their second match against Sri Lanka 2–0 with goals from Ali Ashfaq and Ali Umar, while they ended at the top of the group, leaving the host Pakistan in second even after the goalless draw against them in the final group stage match.

Even though Maldives lost the semi final match against India by one goal to nil, the top scorer award was shared by three of the Maldivian players; Ibrahim hassan, Ali Ashfaq and Ahmed Thoriq scored three goals each.

2008 SAFF Championship winners

The 2008 SAFF Championship draw, which took place on 26 February 2007, placed Maldives in group A, alongside Nepal, India, and Pakistan. Maldives started with a comfortable 3–0 win over Pakistan, with the goals from Mohamed Shifan, Ahmed Thoriq and an own goal from Naveed Akram. In their second match they defeated Nepal 4–1, with two goals apiece from Ismail Mohamed and Ibrahim Fazeel. They lost their last group stage match against India, 0–1.

They advanced to the semi-finals and defeated Sri Lanka 0–1, with a brilliant goal by Ibrahim Fazeel on a pass from Ali Ashfaq. They then advanced to the final for the third time in SAFF Championship history.

In the final three minutes of full-time during the SAFF Championship final against the four time SAFF Championship Champions India, Mukhthar Naseer scored a single goal from a corner kick taken by Ali Ashfaq, winning the SAFF Championship for Maldives for the first time in their history. Maldives won the SAFF Championship by scoring nine goals and conceding two.

In 2008 SAFF Championship, Ali Ashfaq won the Best Player award. Maldives was the team who scored the most goals in this year's competition along with their rivals India. They were also the team who conceded the fewest goals in the tournament.

The SAFF Championship was Maldives first ever gold medal in Maldivian Football history, and to celebrate this memorable day the President declared that 15 June 2008 will be a public holiday. The only goal scored in the final match, by Mukhthar, was his first international goal for the Maldives national football team.

2009 SAFF Championship

Maldives were drawn with the rivals India in group A, along with Afghanistan and Nepal.

Maldives started their campaign as the defending champions, facing a 1–1 draw where The Gorkhalis did not allow the red snappers win the match with the only goal by Ahmed Thoriq. In their second match they defeated Afghanistan by 3–1 with two goals from Ali Ashfaq and one from Ahmed Thoriq. Their next match against rival India on 9 December was won by 2–0, Ahmed Thoriq and Ibrahim Fazeel scoring the goals which took them into the semi finals as group A winners, finishing the group stage ahead of India.

In the semi final, they defeated Sri Lanka with a comfortable score line of 5–1 where Ibrahim Fazeel scored two goals and Ahmed Thoriq, Ali Ashfaq and Ashad Ali scored one goal each, but they lost 3–1 to eventual winners India from a penalty shootout in the final after playing 120 minutes without seeing a goal from either sides. Ibrahim Fazeel was the only player to score in the penalty shootout for Maldives while Ahmed Thoriq, Mukhthar Naseer and Ali Ashfaq failed to convert it from the spot.

Ahmed Thoriq shared the top scorer award with Bangladesh's Enamul Haque and Sri Lanka's Channa Ediri Bandanage scoring four goals each in this competition.

This was the second time Maldives lost the SAFF Championship final in penalties, and Bangabandhu National Stadium was the venue on both occasions.

2011 SAFF Championship

The 2011 SAFF Championship hosted in Jawaharlal Nehru Stadium, Delhi was the tournament with Maldives' worst result. Even though Maldives managed to qualify for the semi finals as the group winner, Maldives ended their campaign with only one win, two draws and losing one game, scoring and conceding 5 goals.

Maldives were in the group B, drawn with Bangladesh, Nepal and Pakistan. They drew 1–1 against Nepal with Ali Ashfaq's only goal and their second game against Pakistan ended goalless. Maldives finished the group stage with a 3–1 win over Bangladesh, with Ahmed Thoriq's brace and Ali Ashfaq's goal.

Maldives lost 3–1 to India in the semi final, Shamweel Qasim scoring Maldives' only goal.

2013 SAFF Championship

Maldives were drawn in the group B alongside Afghanistan, Bhutan and Sri Lanka.

They started the group stage by renewing their record of scoring the most goals by a team in a single game; winning 10–0 against Sri Lanka. In this match, skipper Ali Ashfaq scored a double hat-trick and broke the record of India's IM Vijayan who holds the record of all-time top scorer of the tournament with 12 goals. He also made a new record of scoring the highest number of goals by a single player in a match in the tournament. Remaining goals of this match came from Assadhulla Abdulla, Hassan Adhuham, Ali Fasir and Ali Umar.

In their second match, Ali Ashfaq scored four goals and Ali Fasir scored a brace while Mohammad Umair and Ali Umar scored one goal each in the 8–2 win against Bhutan. Maldives' third match of the group stage against Afghanistan ended goalless.

However, Maldives faced India for a record fourth time in a semi final match of this competition, and never won a semi final match against them as Maldives lost 1–0 in this semi final match at the Dasarath Rangasala Stadium, Kathmandu, Nepal.

Ali Ashfaq won the Golden Boot Award, scoring 10 goals in the competition. He now holds the record of competition's all-time top scorer with 18 goals, and the player to score the highest number of goals in one SAFF Championship; 10. India's IM Vijayan was the previous player to hold this record, scoring 6 goals in the 1997 edition.

2018 SAFF Suzuki Cup winners

Maldives was drawn in a group with Sri Lanka and India. Maldives drew with Sri Lanka at 0–0 and lost to India 2–0. Due to Maldives and Sri Lanka having accumulated the same points a coin toss was held to decide which team will advance to the semi finals against Nepal. Luck was in favor of Maldives as it won the coin toss and the match against Nepal by 3–0.

This meant that Maldives would once against compete with India in the finals. During the first half of the match Maldives player Ibrahim Mahudhee scored the opening goal and in the second half Hamza Mohamed makes an excellent threaded through pass that allowed Ali Fasir to score the second goal for Maldives. India,'s Sumeet Pass scored a consolation goal for India in extra time.

The match ended with Maldives as the victor's of the 2018 Saff Suzuki championship making them the second team in the competition to have ever won the Cup more than once. Maldives goal keeper Mohamed Faisal won the MVP award of the competition for his work between the sticks.

Asian Cup and World Cup qualifications
Maldives has never qualified for such big tournaments and often classified as a weaker team in the continent. Nonetheless, Maldives achieved several impressive results. During 2006 World Cup qualification, Maldives stunned by drawing South Korea, an Asian powerhouse, 0–0 at home; and defeating Vietnam, a rising Asian team, in the same ground with an impressive 3–0. However, its worst defeat also occurred in the World Cup qualification as they were thrashed 0–17 by Iran in Damascus during 1998 World Cup qualification.

Team image

Media coverage
All Maldives matches are broadcast with full commentary on Television Maldives and Dhivehi Raajjeyge Adu Radio Live.

Home stadium
National Football Stadium is a multi-purpose stadium in Malé, Maldives. It is used mostly for football matches of the Dhivehi League, Maldives FA Cup, and International matches. The stadium holds around 11,850 spectators.

Supporters

About 11,500 Maldivian supporters, including the former president Maumoon Abdul Gayyoom, attended to see the 2008 SAFF Championship final match in Sugathadasa Stadium, Colombo, Sri Lanka. After their win, many supporters, together with ministers, gave a warm welcome to the team on their return with their first gold medal. To celebrate this memorable day the President declared that 15 June 2008 will be a public holiday.

Kits

Maldives' home kit comprises a red jersey and red shorts – red is the national colour of the Maldives, and represents the boldness of the nation's heroes.

Recent results and fixtures

2022

2023

Coaching staff

Coaching history
Caretaker managers are listed in italics.

 Temesvári Miklós (1991–93)
 Victor Stănculescu (1993–96)
 Rómulo Cortez (1996–97)
 Vyacheslav Solokho (1999-2001)
 Jozef Jankech (2001–03)
 Manuel Gomes (2004)
 Yordan Stoykov (2005–07)
 Jozef Jankech (2008)
 István Urbányi (2009–10)
 Andrés Cruciani (2010–11)
 István Urbányi (2011–13)
 Ali Nashid (2013–14)
 Drago Mamić (2014)
 Velizar Popov (2015)
 Ismail Mahfooz (2015)
 Ricki Herbert (2015–16)
 Ismail Mahfooz (2016)
 Darren Stewart (2016–18)
 Petar Segrt (2018–19)
 Martin Koopman (2020–21)
 Ali Suzain (2021)
 Francesco Moriero (2021–present)

Players

Current squad
 The following players were called up for the friendly matches.
 Match dates: 14 and 17 December 2022
 Opposition:  and 
 Caps and goals correct as of: 24 September 2022, after the match against .

Recent call-ups
The following players also received a call-up within the last twelve months.

Player records

Players in bold are still active with Maldives.

Competitive record

World Cup record

Asian Cup record

AFC Challenge Cup

South Asian Football Federation Cup

*Draws include knockout matches decided on penalty kicks.
**Gold background colour indicates that the tournament was won.
***Red border color indicates tournament was held on home soil.

Asian Games

Head-to-head record against other countries

See also 
 Maldives women's national football team
 Maldives national under-23 football team
 Maldives national football team results

Notes

References

External links

Official Website
Maldives Soccer Fansite

 
Asian national association football teams
National sports teams established in 1979